Melissa Rose Reid (born 19 September 1987) is an English professional golfer who plays on the Ladies European Tour and the LPGA Tour. In October 2020, she won her maiden LPGA Tour event, the ShopRite LPGA Classic.

Early life and amateur career
Reid was born in Derby, England. As an amateur she won several events including the 2004 and 2005 English Girls' Championship, the 2006 and 2007 Helen Holm Trophy, the 2007 St Rule Trophy, and the 2007 Ladies' British Open Amateur Stroke Play Championship. She played on the Great Britain and Ireland team in the 2006 Curtis Cup.
 
Reid was the low amateur at the 2007 Women's British Open with a T16 finish.

Professional career
Reid failed to earn her card at the 2007 LET Qualifying School in Italy but turned professional in late 2007 and began playing on the Ladies European Tour in 2008 on sponsor invitations. A third-place finish at the Australian Open in early February allowed her to stay in the top 20 on the money list and gain entrance into LET events for the rest of the season. She placed 12th on the money list in 2008 and was named LET Rookie of the Year.

Reid's first LET victory came in 2010 at the Turkish Airlines Ladies Open. She followed that up with two wins in 2011 and was a member of the 2011 Solheim Cup team, securing a spot on the European team as the leader in the LET rankings.

Personal life
In May 2012 Reid's mother, Joy, was killed in an automobile crash near Munich while travelling to see her daughter compete in a Ladies European Tour event. Reid quickly returned to golf but her performance declined rapidly in the ensuing years. In September 2015, Reid told ESPN that her life "was a mess ... I wasn't coping, I was rebelling. I was spending time with people who partied. I was hitting the self-destruct button. I was with a lot of people, but I was lonely." On 10 December 2018, Reid came out as gay in an interview with Athlete Ally.

Professional wins (7)

LPGA Tour wins (1)

Ladies European Tour (6)

Results in LPGA majors
Results not in chronological order before 2019.

^ The Evian Championship was added as a major in 2013.

LA = low amateur
CUT = missed the half-way cut
NT = no tournament
"T" = tied

Summary

Most consecutive cuts made – 3 (three times)
Longest streak of top-10s – 1 (three times)

World ranking
Position in Women's World Golf Rankings at the end of each calendar year.

Ladies European Tour career summary

1 Reid played in only one LET event as a professional in 2007, the Dubai Ladies Masters, in which she finished T35. 
 official as of 18 September 2015

Team appearances
Amateur
European Girls' Team Championship (representing England): 2005 (winners)
Junior Solheim Cup (representing Europe): 2005
Curtis Cup (representing Great Britain & Ireland): 2006
Espirito Santo Trophy (representing England): 2006
Vagliano Trophy (representing Great Britain & Ireland): 2007
European Ladies' Team Championship (representing England): 2007
Commonwealth Trophy (representing Great Britain): 2007 (winners)

Professional
Solheim Cup (representing Europe): 2011 (winners), 2015, 2017, 2021 (winners)
The Queens (representing Europe): 2015, 2017
International Crown (representing England): 2016

Solheim Cup record

References

External links

English female golfers
Ladies European Tour golfers
LPGA Tour golfers
Solheim Cup competitors for Europe
Olympic golfers of Great Britain
Golfers at the 2020 Summer Olympics
LGBT golfers
Lesbian sportswomen
English LGBT sportspeople
Sportspeople from Derby
1987 births
Living people